Five Crows, also known as Hezekiah, Achekaia, or Pahkatos, was a Cayuse Indian chief.  His principal rival  for the role of Head Chief of the Cayuse was Young Chief (Weatenatemany).
Five Crows was the maternal half-brother of Tuekakas, Old Chief Joseph of the Nez Perce, and the brother-in-law of Peopeomoxmox. The richest of the Cayuse chiefs with over 1,000 horses, he was ruined financially by the Cayuse War that followed the 1847 Whitman Mission killings. Although he was not involved in the killings, he took one of the mission hostages, Lorinda Bewley, as his wife. After he was wounded in the Cayuse War the Nez Perce under Tuekakas nursed him back to health. Five Crows was popular with the Cayuse people and spoke often at the treaty council.

Five Crows died in Pendleton, Oregon at age 70 and his body was found near Athena, Oregon.

References

External links
Photograph of Chief Five Crows

Indigenous people of the Pacific Northwest
Native American history of Oregon
19th-century Native Americans
Year of death missing
Year of birth missing
Native American people from Oregon
Cayuse people